Komanos is a village located southeast of Ptolemaida, in Kozani regional unit, within the Greek region of Macedonia. It is situated at an altitude of 660 meters above sea level. The postal code is 50200, while the telephone code is +30 24630. At the 2011 census, the population was 107.

References

Populated places in Kozani (regional unit)